The 2018 season for the  cycling team began in January at the Tour Down Under. As a UCI WorldTeam, they are  obligated to send a squad to every event in the UCI World Tour.

Team roster 

Riders who joined the team for the 2018 season

Riders who left the team during or after the 2017 season

Season victories

National, Continental and World champions

Footnotes

References

External links
 

2018 Team EF Education First-Drapac p/b Cannondale season
2018 in American sports
2018 road cycling season by team